Donald Michel Marcotte (born April 15, 1947) is a Canadian former professional ice hockey player who served his entire National Hockey League career with the Boston Bruins and was noted as a premier defensive forward, while being versatile enough to play any forward position.

After playing his junior league hockey for the Niagara Falls Flyers in 1965, 1966 and 1967, Marcotte - whose rights were owned by the Bruins - turned pro in the 1968 season with the Hershey Bears of the American Hockey League.  After three starring seasons for the Bears, Marcotte was recalled in the 1970 season just in time to be a defensive mainstay on Boston's checking line with Derek Sanderson and Ed Westfall for the Bruins' 1970 Stanley Cup Finals where they ended their 29 year drought to win the championship.

Marcotte scored his first NHL goal in a 3-1 Boston loss to the Montreal Canadiens on February 15, 1969 at the Montreal Forum. 

Marcotte would play twelve more seasons in Boston, winning a second Stanley Cup in 1972, and helping Boston to three more finals in 1974, 1977, and 1978, but Boston did not win the cup. Marcotte was honored by being selected one of the NHL All-Stars for the 1979 Challenge Cup.

Marcotte became noteworthy for his defense and penalty-killing—he led the NHL in shorthanded goals in 1971 with six—while scoring twenty or more goals seven times and thirty goals in 1975. Marcotte was assigned to shadow superstar wingers like the Chicago Black Hawks' Bobby Hull (the "Golden Jet") and Montreal Canadiens' Guy Lafleur (the "Flower"); Lafleur in turn "considered Marcotte the toughest checker he ever faced" after the 1979 Stanley Cup playoffs. Described by teammate Terry O'Reilly, Marcotte was said to have "tremendous concentration. He never takes his eyes off of his winger and he never stops skating. What he lacks in speed and finesse he compensates for with hustle and disciplined play. He is a hard body checker who believes in playing the man before the puck, yet as the small number of minutes he spends in the penalty box indicate, he is not a dirty player".

In his later years as a Bruin, Marcotte mentored Steve Kasper into a premier defensive forward. After being released in training camp by the Bruins in the fall of 1982, Marcotte retired from hockey.  He had played in 868 games, scoring 230 goals and 254 assists for 484 points, and adding 317 penalty minutes.  Marcotte's 21 shorthanded goals in the regular season ranks him fourth in Bruins' history behind only Brad Marchand, Rick Middleton and Derek Sanderson.

Career statistics

References

External links
 

1947 births
Boston Braves (AHL) players
Boston Bruins players
Canadian ice hockey forwards
Hershey Bears players
Living people
Niagara Falls Flyers players
Oklahoma City Blazers (1965–1977) players
People from Victoriaville
Stanley Cup champions
Ice hockey people from Quebec
Canadian expatriate ice hockey players in the United States